Geolog Stadium is a multi-purpose stadium in Tyumen, Russia.  It is currently used mostly for football matches and is the home stadium of FC Tyumen.  The stadium holds 13,057 people, all seated.  Since 2008, many health units including a sports hall and gymnasium, swimming pool, saunas, and a restaurant, have been added to the complex.

References

External links
Stadium information

Football venues in Russia
Multi-purpose stadiums in Russia
Buildings and structures in Tyumen
1983 establishments in Russia
Sports venues completed in 1983